Nepal participated at the 16th Asian Games in Guangzhou, China.

Medalists

Archery

Athletics

Badminton

Boxing

Cricket

Chess

Cycling

Golf

Gymnastics

Judo

Kabaddi

Karate

Shooting

Soft Tennis

Table Tennis

Taekwondo

Tennis

Weightlifting

Wrestling

Wushu

Nations at the 2010 Asian Games
2010
Asian Games